The women's qualification competition at the 2011 World Artistic Gymnastics Championships took place October 7–8, 2011, in Tokyo. A total of 216 gymnasts participated.

Team

Individual all-around

Vault

Uneven bars

Balance beam

Floor exercise

References

2011 World Artistic Gymnastics Championships
2011 in women's gymnastics